Edmund Kugbila (born September 21, 1990) is a former Ghanaian-born American football offensive guard. He played college football at Valdosta State, and was drafted by the Panthers in the fourth round of the 2013 NFL Draft.

Early years
Kugbila was born in Ghana.  He moved to the United States at age 10, after his parents won permanent residency allowance in the "green card lottery".  He attended Central Gwinnett High School in Lawrenceville, Georgia, and played high school football for the Central Gwinnett Black Knights.

College career
While attending Valdosta State University, Kugbila played for the Valdosta State Blazers football team from 2009 to 2012.

Professional career
The Carolina Panthers chose Kugbila in the fourth round, with the 108th overall pick, of the 2013 NFL Draft. Kugbila suffered from a strained hamstring, and after suffering numerous setbacks, he was placed on injured reserve on August 27. After rehabbing the injury in the offseason, he injured his back. It was announced on July 24, 2014 that he would undergo back surgery and miss the entire season. On May 20, 2015, he was waived, appearing in zero games.

References

External links
Valdosta State Blazers bio

1990 births
Living people
People from Lawrenceville, Georgia
Sportspeople from the Atlanta metropolitan area
Players of American football from Georgia (U.S. state)
Ghanaian players of American football
American football offensive guards
Valdosta State Blazers football players
Carolina Panthers players
Ghanaian emigrants to the United States